Bienvenido Granda, born Rosendo Bienvenido Granda Aguilera (Havana, August 30, 1915 - Mexico City, July 9, 1983), was a Cuban vocalist/musician, singing boleros, son montunos, guarachas and other Cuban rhythms. He was best known for having been the lead singer of the Cuban ensemble Sonora Matancera in the 1940s and 50s.

For sporting a prodigious mustache, he was nicknamed El bigote que canta (The mustache that sings) and El bigote que canta con estilo (The mustache that sings with style).

Biography 
Bienvenido Granda was orphaned at six years of age. He discovered his talent for singing various Cuban rhythms and tango as a child when he sang for spare change on buses in Cuba.

He traveled to Puerto Rico in 1941. The purpose of the trip was to record with the popular group Cuarteto Marcano. Two songs were recorded.

Bienvenido Granda made several appearances on Cuban radio stations such as Radio Cadena Azul, Radio Cadena Suaritos, Radio Progreso and Radio CMQ. This was done as a way of gaining wider exposure.

In 1942, Bienvenido Granda became the lead singer with one of the most popular bands of all Cuban/Afro-Cuban bands, the legendary Conjunto Sonora Matancera. Bienvenido Granda performed, recorded and achieved his greatest success with La Sonora Matancera until 1954, the year in which he began his solo career, having left the group after a bitter argument with Rogelio Martínez, its director, over money. El bigote que canta wanted to be paid more than his fellow band members even though La Sonora was a cooperative. His legacy with the band is unmatched as no vocalist recorded more songs with La Sonora Matancera than Bienvenido Granda. He put on vinyl over 200 songs with this group.

After leaving Sonora Matancera Bienvenido Granda performed in several Latin American countries. He settled in Mexico City as a result of the Cuban Revolution. Bienvenido Granda sang several of the different musical genres created in Cuba, being especially proficient in the guaracha. He was also a fine bolero singer.

Discography 
Romance Tropical
16 exitos con la Sonora Matancera
 Volume 14 of Big Leyendas de la música II
Musical History
Canta Sus Exitos

Success 
These songs, all recorded with the immortal Sonora Matancera, are among his greatest successes:

La ola marina
Echa pa'llá chico
Vacilón: two slightly different versions
Qué jelengue
El cuento del sapo
Machuquillo
Pugilato
Manteca
Qué lengua más larga
Lo que es la rumba
Yo la mato 
Feliz viaje 
El ajiaco 
Esa sí es cheque
Cuco-cheche-malo
El bobo de la yuca 
Vive como yo 
Fiesta brava 
Se formó la bronca 
Tocando madera
El velorio
Ya se rompió el coco
Tu precio
Y del Vedado que
Florecilla de amor
Cinturita
Ya se peinó María 
Oro falso
Ya se rompió el muñeco 
Dejastes
Tumba y quinto 
Pan de piquito
Espérame un rato más
Eso se hincha
Sarará
Hay que dejarse de cuento
Calla
No me eches la culpa
Dónde están los rumberos
Señora
Angustia
Qué dichoso es
En la orilla del mar
Pecastes de infiel
Sujétate la lengua

References

External links 
 Bienvenido Granda
 Bienvenido Granda

20th-century Cuban male singers
1915 births
1983 deaths
Cuban emigrants to Mexico